Black Castle, East Lothian is an Iron Age hillfort with a number of defensive banks, located  south-east of Gifford, East Lothian, Scotland. It is south of the B6355 road, between Darent House and Green Castle hillfort.

It has an inner and an outer rampart, and two entrances marked by causeways. To the west is a plantation named Black Castle wood.

It is a designated scheduled ancient monument.

See also
Blackcastle Hill, East Lothian
Chesters Hill Fort
White Castle, East Lothian
Traprain Law
List of places in East Lothian
List of hill forts in Scotland

References

Archaeological sites in East Lothian
Hill forts in Scotland
History of East Lothian
Scheduled Ancient Monuments in East Lothian